Zhukovsky Air Force Engineering Academy – is a higher military educational institution for training and retraining of engineers for the Russian Air Force. 

The academy trains specialists – engineers, research engineers in the following specialties:

 Technical maintenance of aircraft and engines
 Robotic aircraft armament system
 Electronics and automation of physical systems
 Technical maintenance of aircraft electrical systems and flight control and navigation systems
 Software of computers and automated systems
 Metrology and metrological support
 Technical operation of the transport of radio equipment
 Electronic warfare
 The study of natural resources by means of aerospace

Organizational structure 
The academy has the main campus in Moscow, and training centers in Monino, Noginsk and Kashira.

Faculties and schools 
 No. 1 – aircraft
 No. 2 – aircraft armament
 No. 3 – aircraft equipment
 No. 4 – aviation electronic equipment
 No. 5 – training of foreign specialists
 No. 6 – basic training

History 
Through its 90-year history the academy has undergone many reorganizations and name changes. The list below is not complete.

The Moscow Aviation College 
The academy traces its history back to the Moscow Aviation College which was created on the initiative of Professor Zhukovsky in 1919.

Institute of Engineers of the Red Air Fleet 
On 26 September 1920 the Revolutionary Military Council has issued an order number 1946, which reorganized The Moscow Aviation College into the Zhukovsky Red Air Fleet Institute of Engineers.

Air Force Academy named after Zhukovsky
On September 9, 1922, the academy was renamed into Air Force Academy named after N.E. Zhukovsky. 
In the summer of 1923, the academy moved to the Petrovsky Palace. In March 1940 the command, navigator, operational departments were separated into a new Gagarin Air Force Academy. Since 1940, the academy has prepared only the engineering staff for the Air Force.

Recent developments
In 2008, the academy was amalgamated with the Gagarin Air Force Academy to form a joint Zhukovsky – Gagarin Air Force Academy. The full name of the new academy is Russian Air Force Military Educational and Scientific Center “Air Force Academy named after Professor N.E. Zhukovsky and Y.A. Gagarin”.

For further history of the academy see the article on the Zhukovsky – Gagarin Air Force Academy.

Chiefs of the academy 
The following have served as chiefs of the academy:
 1922—1923 — Alexander Vegener 
 1924—1925 — Nikolai Sollogub  
 1925—1927 — Vladimir Lazarevich 
 1927—1933 — Sergey Horkov 
 1934—1936 — Alexander Todorsky  
 1936—1940 — Zinoviy Pomerantsev 
 1940—1941 — Nikolay Sokolov-Sokolenok 
 1941—1942 — Stepan Hadeev 
 1942—1947 — Nikolay Sokolov-Sokolenok 
 1947—1969 — Vladimir Volkov 
 1969—1973 — Nikolay Fedayev 
 1973—1986 — Vasiliy Filippov 
 1986—1992 — Vitaliy Kremlev 
 1992—2002 — Vladimir Kovalyonok
 с 2002 — Anatoly Maksimov

Notable faculty 
 Irina Grekova
 Jügderdemidiin Gürragchaa

Notable graduates
Among the academy graduates 865 were awarded the title Hero of the Soviet Union, 61 twice, and Air Marshal Ivan Kozhedub this title was given three times, 89 people became laureates of the Lenin and State prizes.
Among the graduates of academy – the first cosmonaut Yuri Gagarin, the first woman-cosmonaut Valentina Tereshkova, the first man to walk in space Alexei Leonov, marshal of aviation Sergei Khudyakov, the famous aircraft designers Sergei Ilyushin, Artem Mikoyan and Alexander Sergeyevich Yakovlev.

Notes

See also
 Zhukovsky Academy page at the official site of the Russian Ministry of Defence. Раздел ВВИА на сайте Министерства обороны РФ.
 Zhukovsky Academy official site Сайт, посвящённый ВВИА имени профессора Н. Е. Жуковского и ее выпускникам.
 Zhukovsky Academy community site Сообщество ВВИА в «Живом журнале».
 Zhukovsky Academy graduates forum Форум выпускников академии.
 Zhukovsky Academy First Faculty graduates forum Сайт выпускников академии 1 факультет 2004 г.в.

Air force academies
Military academies of Russia
Military education and training in Russia
Military academies of the Soviet Union
Soviet Air Forces education and training